Reza Heidari (born April 18, 1996) is an Iranian-Finnish footballer who plays for AC Kajaani.

Career statistics
As of 1 June 2019.

References

1996 births
Living people
Finnish footballers
Iranian footballers
Pallohonka players
FC Honka players
PK-35 Vantaa (men) players
Kemi City F.C. players
IF Gnistan players
HIFK Fotboll players
AC Kajaani players
Finnish people of Iranian descent
Veikkausliiga players
Ykkönen players
Kakkonen players
Sportspeople of Iranian descent
Association football midfielders
Nurmijärven Jalkapalloseura players
Footballers from Tampere